The Rocky Mountain Wings Ridge Runner is a family of American high wing, strut-braced, single engine, conventional landing gear aircraft that were designed by Stace Schrader and were produced by Rocky Mountain Wings of Nampa, Idaho for amateur construction from 2000 to 2018.

Following a lawsuit in 2018 the company closed, production ended and its website was taken down by June 2019.

Design and development
Introduced at Airventure, Oshkosh, Wisconsin in July 2000, the first Ridge Runner was a single seater designed as an FAR 103 Ultralight Vehicles compliant aircraft that would have an empty weight within that category's  empty weight limit.

The designer, Stace Schrader was formerly involved with Avid Aircraft, the Denney Kitfox and Sky Raider LLC designs, all similar aircraft. The resulting aircraft was described by reviewer Andre Cliche as "a clone identical to its predecessors except for a few details like, for example the type of ailerons and balloon tires for rough terrain operations."

The aircraft has an optional powder coated 4130 steel tube frame fuselage covered in doped fabric. The wing is constructed with aluminium tube spars and is also fabric-covered. The kit includes many pre-fabricated parts, including the wing ribs, seat belts and shoulder harnesses, wheels and tires. The manufacturer estimates the construction time as 250–600 hours, depending on the options selected and builder experience.

The Ridge Runner 1 requires a very light engine to remain under  empty weight and the specified engine remains the out-of-production  Rotax 277.

Variants
Ridge Runner Model 1 Ultralight
Original model, a single seat, FAR 103 compliant aircraft, with a  empty weight when equipped with the out-of-production  Rotax 277 engine, or alternatively an experimental light sport aircraft. Acceptable power range .
Ridge Runner Model 2
Acceptable power range . The manufacturer says of this model: "Ridge Runner II is not a full two place. It has a small jump seat or cargo area"
Ridge Runner Model 3
Light sport or amateur-built version, with two seats in tandem with dual controls. Acceptable power range .
Ridge Runner Model 4
Light sport or amateur-built version, with two seats in side-by-side configuration with dual controls. Acceptable power range .

Specifications (Ridge Runner 1 Ultralight)

See also

References

External links
Official website archives

2000s United States ultralight aircraft